Silent Wings Museum, "The Legacy of The World War II Glider Pilots," is a museum in Lubbock, Texas. The museum is housed in the former tower and terminal building of Lubbock's airport during the 1950s, and 1960s.

History
The museum is located on the site of World War II South Plains Army Air Field, where glider pilots were trained between 1942 and 1945, and after which time they were required also to command skills in powered flight. The giant "silent wing" gliders flew soldiers and supplies largely undetected behind enemy lines because they had no engine noise. The Lubbock site was initially chosen for the Army's glider school because of its dry climate, warm weather, mostly clear skies, and good will in the local community. The arid climate surroundings of the South Plains generally tend to create upward air currents and relatively few low-cloud formations, both of which are conditions deemed desirable in civilian gliding. The glider training area is now within the scope of the museum and of the nearby Lubbock Preston Smith International Airport.

In 1971, former pilots of the U.S. Army Air Force banded together to form the National World War II Glider Pilots Association, Inc. Their mission was to establish a forum for glider pilots to interact socially and to provide the framework for the preservation of the history of the U.S. glider program.

One of its first goals was to locate and restore a WACO CG-4A (See CG-4 Hadrian) glider for public display and viewing. Several former glider pilots living in the Dallas area learned of just such a glider sitting on top of a tire store in Fresno, California. After World War II, the giant, bulky aircraft had been purchased as military surplus, placed on top of the building, and subsequently used as advertising. In 1979, the glider was purchased, restored, and completed in time for the glider pilots' annual reunion in Dallas. After that reunion, plans were made and steps were taken to build a museum to house the CG-4A.

The first Silent Wings Museum opened to the public on November 10, 1984, in Terrell, east of Dallas. By 1997, the need for a more permanent museum home was realized. Responding to the need for a permanent glider home, the city of Lubbock, where a majority of the pilots had originally trained, offered to provide a new site for the museum. The pilots agreed to the new location, and the Terrell site closed in January 2001. The following October, the former South Plains Army Air Field site opened the new Silent Wings Museum with the restored CG-4A glider as the centerpiece of the exhibits.

Exhibits
The museum features in its theater a 15-minute program titled Silent Wings: The Story of the World War II Glider Program. Visitors then move on to the Timeline, Hangar and Combat Galleries. Photographs and artifacts include a fully restored WACO CG-4A glider, TG-4 trainer, airborne equipment, a small barracks rendition from the Lubbock Army Air Field, and a living exhibit: the British Horsa Glider restoration project.

Education and outreach
Silent Wings offers a variety of outreach programs and provides speakers who can tailor a program to fit a group's meeting. The Adams Research Library is located within the Silent Wings Museum. It is home to an extensive archive and book collection about the World War II military glider program. Research appointments can be scheduled.

Robert Allen Todd
Robert Allen Todd (1920-2009), a World War II glider pilot and retired lieutenant colonel in the U.S. Air Force Reserve, served on the first Silent Wings board and was instrumental in relocating the museum from Terrell to Lubbock. A native of Fort Worth, Todd was an artist at the Lubbock Avalanche-Journal from 1948 to 1985. He graduated from R. L. Paschal High School and received a degree in commercial art from what is now the University of Texas at Arlington. He also obtained a pilot's license from Texas Christian University.
	 
Todd trained at South Plains Army Air Field in Lubbock as a volunteer in the Army Air Corps Combat Glider Program. On June 6, 1944, he piloted a glider in the D-Day Normandy invasion. He flew several other missions and was recognized by France with a certificate recounting his service. He also received Holland's highest honor, the Order of the Orange Lanyard for his service in Operation Market Garden. In his later years, Todd returned to painting with oils, capturing the essence of New Mexico's missions and the expansive western landscapes with his work. Todd died on September 14, 2009.

Gallery

See also
American Wind Power Center
Lubbock Lake Landmark
Museum of Texas Tech University
National Ranching Heritage Center
Glider snatch pick-up

References

External links
Silent Wings Museum - official site

Photos of the Llano Estacado

Aerospace museums in Texas
Museums in Lubbock, Texas
Military and war museums in Texas
World War II museums in the United States
Military in Lubbock, Texas
Museums established in 2001
2001 establishments in Texas